The EHF Passau Black Hawks are an ice hockey team in Passau, Germany. They play in the Oberliga (ice hockey), the third level of German ice hockey. The club was founded in 1994 and has played in the Oberliga since the 2007/08 season.

External links
 Official site

Ice hockey teams in Germany
Passau
Ice hockey clubs established in 1994
1994 establishments in Germany
Ice hockey teams in Bavaria